Bernard Frederick (birth unknown – death unknown) was a Welsh rugby union and professional rugby league footballer who played in the 1910s. He played club level rugby union (RU) for Newport RFC, and representative level rugby league (RL) for Wales, and at club level for Oldham (Heritage № 146), as a forward (prior to the specialist positions of), during the era of contested scrums.

International honours
Bernard Frederick won a cap for Wales (RL) while at Oldham in 1913.

References

External links
Statistics at orl-heritagetrust.org.uk
 (archived by web.archive.org) Profile at blackandambers.co.uk

Newport RFC players
Oldham R.L.F.C. players
Place of birth missing
Place of death missing
Rugby league forwards
Wales national rugby league team players
Welsh rugby league players
Welsh rugby union players
Year of birth missing
Year of death missing